Nadia Mohammad Ali Hamade (July 8, 1935 – June 20, 1983) was a Lebanese Francophone poet, who authored numerous volumes of poetry.

Early life
Nadia Mohammad Ali Hamadeh was born in Beirut in 1935, to a Lebanese Druze father, Mohammed Ali Hamadeh, who was a diplomat and writer, and a French mother. She grew up as bilingual in the presence of two cultures. Her brother, Marwan Hamadeh, is a politician, and another brother, Ali Hamadeh, is a journalist at An Nahar and Future TV.

Education
Nadia Tueni was educated in French schools in Lebanon and Greece. She attended Ecole des Soeurs de Besançon, then La Mission Laïque Française. She received her secondary education at the Lycée Français in Athens where her father was ambassador of Lebanon. She received her law degree at the Université Saint-Joseph in Beirut. However, there is another report stating that she attended the Université Saint-Joseph, but could not complete her study there due to her marriage in 1954.

Career
Tueni published her first book of poems, Les Textes Blonds, in 1963. She worked as the literary editor of the Lebanese French-language newspaper, Le Jour, in 1967 and contributed to various Arabic and French publications.

Personal life
She married Ghassan Tueni, the publisher of An Nahar and doyen of the Lebanese press, in 1953 in a civil marriage ceremony. They had three children, all of whom would predecease their father, who long outlived her. Her son, Gebran Tueni, a journalist and politician, was assassinated in 2005. Another son, Makram, was 21 when he died in a car accident in Paris in 1987. A daughter, Nayla, who was born in 1955 died of cancer at age 7.
Her death deeply affected Nadia and led her to compose her first collection: Les Textes Blonds, which was published in 1963. In 1967, she became a literary editor at Le Jour, where she contributed to various Arabic and French publications. She also has a brother, the minister and deputy Marwan Hamade and a step brother, a journalist in An Nahar daily newspaper, Ali Hamade. 
She describes her country, Lebanon, in Poems of Love and War (2006:xxxv) as follows: "I belong to a country that commits suicide every day while it is being assassinated. As a matter of fact, I belong to a country that died several times. Why should I not die too of the gnawing, ugly, slow, and vicious death, of this Lebanese death?"

Death
Nadia Tueni died in Beit Meri near Beirut in 1983 after an 18-year battle with cancer. She was 47.

Awards
She received several awards during her lifetime, including the Prix de l'Académie Française, the Order of La Pléiade, and the Prix Said Akl.

Publications

References

1935 births
1983 deaths
Lebanese women poets
Deaths from cancer in Lebanon
20th-century Lebanese women writers
20th-century Lebanese poets
Nadia
21st-century Lebanese poets
21st-century Lebanese women writers